Francisco Leoncio Portillo Maidana (born 24 July 1984) is a Paraguayan-born Chilean footballer. His current team is Primera División de Chile side Universidad de Concepción.

Honours

Player
Universidad de Concepción
 Primera B (1): 2013 Transición

External links
 
 

1984 births
Living people
Paraguayan footballers
Paraguayan expatriate footballers
Puerto Montt footballers
Universidad de Concepción footballers
Chilean Primera División players
Primera B de Chile players
Expatriate footballers in Chile
Expatriate footballers in Argentina
Association football midfielders
People from Misiones Province
Naturalized citizens of Chile